The 2013–14 Jordan FA Cup is the 34th season of the national football competition of Jordan. The winners of the competition will earn a spot in the 2015 AFC Cup.

All twelve top-flight teams compete in the competition and are joined by teams from the second division for the first time since the 2009–10 edition. The first games were played on 18 July 2013.

The 12 teams from the Jordan Premier League will start in a group stage at round one. Six teams in two groups, with the top four sides progressing to the third round. Here they will be joined by the 2nd tier sides who start in round 2. Round Two features games played over one game where as Round Three will be played over two legs.

Group stage

Group A

Group B

Round two
This round featured sides from the second tier that did not compete in the group phase. The group phase was only for top tier clubs.

Round three
Bla'ama SC and Sahab Club received byes to this round

First leg

Second leg

Al Baqa'a advance 6:1 on aggregate

Al Faisaly advance 5:3 on aggregate

Al Sheikh Hussein advance 5:1 on aggregate

Al Ramtha advance 1:0 on aggregate

Shabab Al-Ordon advance 1:0 on aggregate

Al Hussein advance 3:1 on aggregate

That Ras advance 7:3 on aggregate

Al Wehdat advance 4:1 on aggregate

Quarter-finals

1st Leg

2nd Leg

Al Baqa'a advance 7:2 on aggregate

Al Ramtha advance 5:4 on penalties

Al Wehdat advance 2:1 on aggregate

Shabab Al-Ordon advance 3:1 on penalties

Semi finals

1st Leg

Match played behind closed doors

2nd Leg

Al Baqa'a advance on penalties

Al Wehdat advance 6:1 on aggregate

Final

References

External links
 at Goalzz.com
 
Jordan Cup at soccerway.com

Jordan FA Cup seasons
Jordan
Cup